Heinrich Ott may refer to:

Heinrich Ott (physicist) (1894–1962), German physicist
Heinrich Ott (bobsledder), Swiss bobsledder, fl. late 1980s